Donny Harold Monim (born 3 May 1995), is an Indonesian professional footballer who plays as a centre-back for Liga 1 club Bhayangkara.

Club career

Barito Putera
In 2019, Donny Monim signed a contract with Indonesian Liga 1 club Barito Putera. Monim made his debut on 20 May 2019 in a match against Persija Jakarta. On 22 October 2019, Monim scored his first goal for Barito Putera against PSIS Semarang in the 23rd minute at the Demang Lehman Stadium, Martapura.

Persipura Jayapura
He was signed for Persipura Jayapura to play in Liga 1 in the 2020 season. This season was suspended on 27 March 2020 due to the COVID-19 pandemic. The season was abandoned and was declared void on 20 January 2021.

Return to Barito Putera
Monim was signed for Barito Putera to play in Liga 1 in the 2022–23 season. He made his league debut on 23 July 2022 in a match against Madura United at the Gelora Ratu Pamelingan Stadium, Pamekasan.

Bhayangkara
On 29 January 2023, Monim signed a contract with Liga 1 club Bhayangkara from Barito Putera. Monim made his league debut for the club in a 3–2 win against Persikabo 1973, coming on as a substituted Aji Joko Sutopo.

Career statistics

Club

References

External links
 Donny Monim at Soccerway
 Donny Monim at Liga Indonesia

1995 births
Living people
Indonesian footballers
Association football central defenders
Perseru Serui players
PS Barito Putera players
Persipura Jayapura players
Liga 1 (Indonesia) players
People from Yapen Islands Regency
Sportspeople from Papua